Ernest Gerald Maun (February 3, 1901 – January 1, 1987) was a Major League Baseball pitcher who played for the New York Giants in  and the Philadelphia Phillies in .

External links

1901 births
1987 deaths
Major League Baseball pitchers
Baseball players from Kansas
Philadelphia Phillies players
New York Giants (NL) players